An interclavicle is a bone which, in most tetrapods, is located between the clavicles. Therian mammals (marsupials and placentals) are the only tetrapods which never have an interclavicle, although some members of other groups also lack one. In therians, it is replaced by the sternum which is similar in shape and function but forms via endochondral ossification (cartilage forming bone). The interclavicle, on the other hand, develops through intramembranous ossification of the skin. Monotremes, although part of the mammalian class, do have interclavicles.

References

Bones of the upper limb
Vertebrate anatomy